Donald Winston Jowett  (4 March 1931 – 21 July 2011) was a New Zealand sprinter and rugby union player who represented his country at the 1950 and 1954 British Empire and Commonwealth Games, winning a bronze medal in 1950, and gold and silver medals in 1954.

Jowett won seven New Zealand national athletics titles: the 220 yards in 1952, 1953, and 1954; and the 440 yards in 1953, 1954, 1955, and 1957. He also won five national titles at under-19 level: the 440 yards in 1945, 1946, and 1947; and the 880 yards in 1946 and 1947.

He later moved to Queensland where he was involved in rugby and athletics administration, coaching and refereeing. In the 2005 Australia Day Honours, Jowett was awarded the Order of Australia Medal for service to sport, particularly athletics, as an administrator, technical official and coach, and to the community through church and welfare organisations. His daughter Sue Jowett became an Olympic sprinter.

Don Jowett died on 21 July 2011.

References

1931 births
2011 deaths
New Zealand male sprinters
Athletes (track and field) at the 1950 British Empire Games
Athletes (track and field) at the 1954 British Empire and Commonwealth Games
Commonwealth Games gold medallists for New Zealand
Commonwealth Games silver medallists for New Zealand
Commonwealth Games bronze medallists for New Zealand
Commonwealth Games medallists in athletics
Otago rugby union players
New Zealand emigrants to Australia
Recipients of the Medal of the Order of Australia
Medallists at the 1950 British Empire Games
Medallists at the 1954 British Empire and Commonwealth Games